Ṇa (also romanized as Nna) is a consonant of Indic abugidas. In modern Indic scripts, Ṇa is derived from the early "Ashoka" Brahmi letter  after having gone through the Gupta letter . As with the other cerebral consonants, ṇa is not found in most scripts for Tai, Sino-Tibetan, and other non-Indic languages, except for a few scripts, which retain these letters for transcribing Sanskrit religious terms.

Āryabhaṭa numeration

Aryabhata used Devanagari letters for numbers, very similar to the Greek numerals, even after the invention of Indian numerals. The values of the different forms of ण are: 
ण  = 15 (१५)
णि  = 1,500 (१ ५००)
णु  = 150,000 (१ ५० ०००)
णृ  = 15,000,000 (१ ५० ०० ०००)
णॢ  = 1,500,000,000 (१ ५० ०० ०० ०००)
णे  = 15 (१५×१०१०)
णै  = 15 (१५×१०१२)
णो  = 15 (१५×१०१४)
णौ  = 15 (१५×१०१६)

Historic Nna
There are three different general early historic scripts - Brahmi and its variants, Kharoṣṭhī, and Tocharian, the so-called slanting Brahmi. Nna as found in standard Brahmi,  was a simple geometric shape, with variations toward more flowing forms by the Gupta . The Tocharian Nna  did not have an alternate Fremdzeichen form. The third form of nna, in Kharoshthi was probably derived from Aramaic separately from the Brahmi letter.

Brahmi Nna
The Brahmi letter , Nna, is probably derived from the altered Aramaic Nun , and is thus related to the modern Latin N and Greek Nu. Several identifiable styles of writing the Brahmi Nna can be found, most associated with a specific set of inscriptions from an artifact or diverse records from an historic period. As the earliest and most geometric style of Brahmi, the letters found on the Edicts of Ashoka and other records from around that time are normally the reference form for Brahmi letters, with vowel marks not attested until later forms of Brahmi back-formed to match the geometric writing style.

Tocharian Nna
The Tocharian letter  is derived from the Brahmi , but does not have an alternate Fremdzeichen form.

Kharoṣṭhī Nna
The Kharoṣṭhī letter  is generally accepted as being derived from the altered Aramaic Nun , and is thus related to N and Nu, in addition to the Brahmi Nna.

Devanagari Nna

Ṇa (ण) is a consonant of the Devanagari abugida. It ultimately arose from the Brahmi letter , after having gone through the Gupta letter . Letters that derive from it are the Gujarati letter ણ, and the Modi letter 𑘜.

Devanagari-using Languages
Like all Indic scripts, Devanagari uses vowel marks attached to the base consonant to override the inherent /ə/ vowel:

Conjuncts with ण

Devanagari exhibits conjunct ligatures, as is common in Indic scripts. In modern Devanagari texts, most conjuncts are formed by reducing the letter shape to fit tightly to the following letter, usually by dropping a character's vertical stem, sometimes referred to as a "half form". Some conjunct clusters are always represented by a true ligature, instead of a shape that can be broken into constituent independent letters. Vertically stacked conjuncts are ubiquitous in older texts, while only a few are still used routinely in modern Devanagari texts. The use of ligatures and vertical conjuncts may vary across languages using the Devanagari script, with Marathi in particular preferring the use of half forms where texts in other languages would show ligatures and vertical stacks.

Ligature conjuncts of ण
True ligatures are quite rare in Indic scripts. The most common ligated conjuncts in Devanagari are in the form of a slight mutation to fit in context or as a consistent variant form appended to the adjacent characters. Those variants include Na and the Repha and Rakar forms of Ra. Nepali and Marathi texts use the "eyelash" Ra half form  for an initial "R" instead of repha.
 Repha र্ (r) + ण (ṇa) gives the ligature rṇa: 

 Eyelash र্ (r) + ण (ṇa) gives the ligature rṇa:

 ण্ (ṇ) + rakar र (ra) gives the ligature ṇra:

 ण্ (ṇ) + न (na) gives the ligature ṇna:

Stacked conjuncts of ण
Vertically stacked ligatures are the most common conjunct forms found in Devanagari text. Although the constituent characters may need to be stretched and moved slightly in order to stack neatly, stacked conjuncts can be broken down into recognizable base letters, or a letter and an otherwise standard ligature.
 छ্ (cʰ) + ण (ṇa) gives the ligature cʰṇa:

 ढ্ (ḍʱ) + ण (ṇa) gives the ligature ḍʱṇa:

 ड্ (ḍ) + ण (ṇa) gives the ligature ḍṇa:

 द্ (d) + ण (ṇa) gives the ligature dṇa:

 ह্ (h) + ण (ṇa) gives the ligature hṇa:

 ख্ (kʰ) + ण (ṇa) gives the ligature kʰṇa:

 ङ্ (ŋ) + ण (ṇa) gives the ligature ŋṇa:

 ण্ (ṇ) + ल (la) gives the ligature ṇla:

 प্ (p) + ण (ṇa) gives the ligature pṇa:

 ठ্ (ṭʰ) + ण (ṇa) gives the ligature ṭʰṇa:

 ट্ (ṭ) + ण (ṇa) gives the ligature ṭṇa:

Bengali Nna
The Bengali script ণ is derived from the Siddhaṃ , and is marked by a reduced head line, and less geometric shape than its Devanagari counterpart, ण. The inherent vowel of Bengali consonant letters is /ɔ/, so the bare letter ণ will sometimes be transliterated as "nno" instead of "nna". Adding okar, the "o" vowel mark, gives a reading of /n̳o/.
Like all Indic consonants, ণ can be modified by marks to indicate another (or no) vowel than its inherent "a".

ণ in Bengali-using languages
ণ is used as a basic consonant character in all of the major Bengali script orthographies, including Bengali and Assamese.

Conjuncts with ণ
Bengali ণ exhibits conjunct ligatures, as is common in Indic scripts, in the form of both stacked and linear (horizontal) ligatures.
 গ্ (g) + ণ (ṇa) gives the ligature gṇa:

 ণ্ (ṇ) + ড (ḍa) gives the ligature ṇḍa:

 ণ্ (ṇ) + ঢ (ḍʱa) gives the ligature ṇḍʱa:

 ণ্ (ṇ) + ড্ (ḍ) + র (ra) gives the ligature ṇḍra, with the ra phala suffix:

 ণ্ (ṇ) + ড্ (ḍ) + য (ya) gives the ligature ṇḍya, with the ya phala suffix:

 ণ্ (ṇ) + ম (ma) gives the ligature ṇma:

 ণ্ (ṇ) + ণ (ṇa) gives the ligature ṇṇa:

 ণ্ (ṇ) + ট (ṭa) gives the ligature ṇṭa:

 ণ্ (ṇ) + ঠ (ṭʰa) gives the ligature ṇṭʰa:

 ণ্ (ṇ) + ঠ্ (ṭʰ) + য (ya) gives the ligature ṇṭʰya, with the ya phala suffix:

 ণ্ (ṇ) + য (ya) gives the ligature ṇya, with the ya phala suffix:

 র্ (r) + ণ (ṇa) gives the ligature rṇa, with the repha prefix:

 র্ (r) + ণ্ (ṇ) + য (ya) gives the ligature rṇya, with the repha prefix and ya phala suffix:

Gujarati Ṇa

Ṇa (ણ) is the fifteenth consonant of the Gujarati abugida. It is derived from the Devanagari Ṇa  with the top bar (shiro rekha) removed, and ultimately the Brahmi letter .

Gujarati-using Languages
The Gujarati script is used to write the Gujarati and Kutchi languages. Like all Indic scripts, Gujarati uses vowel marks attached to the base consonant to override the inherent /ə/ vowel:

Conjuncts with ણ

Gujarati ણ exhibits conjunct ligatures, much like its parent Devanagari Script. Most Gujarati conjuncts can only be formed by reducing the letter shape to fit tightly to the following letter, usually by dropping a character's vertical stem, sometimes referred to as a "half form". A few conjunct clusters can be represented by a true ligature, instead of a shape that can be broken into constituent independent letters, and vertically stacked conjuncts can also be found in Gujarati, although much less commonly than in Devanagari.
True ligatures are quite rare in Indic scripts. The most common ligated conjuncts in Gujarati are in the form of a slight mutation to fit in context or as a consistent variant form appended to the adjacent characters. Those variants include Na and the Repha and Rakar forms of Ra.
 ર્ (r) + ણ (ɳa) gives the ligature RṆa:

 ણ્ (ɳ) + ર (ra) gives the ligature ṆRa:

 હ્ (h) + ણ (ɳa) gives the ligature HṆa:

Note that the ligature for Gujarati HṆa contains the half form of Devanagari Ṇa  instead of a form of Gujarati Ṇa.

Javanese Nna

Telugu Ṇa

Ṇa (ణ) is a consonant of the Telugu abugida. It ultimately arose from the Brahmi letter . It is closely related to the Kannada letter ಣ. Since it lacks the v-shaped headstroke common to most Telugu letters, ణ remains unaltered by most vowel matras, and its subjoined form is simply a smaller version of the normal letter shape.
Telugu conjuncts are created by reducing trailing letters to a subjoined form that appears below the initial consonant of the conjunct. Many subjoined forms are created by dropping their headline, with many extending the end of the stroke of the main letter body to form an extended tail reaching up to the right of the preceding consonant. This subjoining of trailing letters to create conjuncts is in contrast to the leading half forms of Devanagari and Bengali letters. Ligature conjuncts are not a feature in Telugu, with the only non-standard construction being an alternate subjoined form of Ṣa (borrowed from Kannada) in the KṢa conjunct.

Malayalam Ṇa

Ṇa (ണ) is a consonant of the Malayalam abugida. It ultimately arose from the Brahmi letter , via the Grantha letter  Nna. Like in other Indic scripts, Malayalam consonants have the inherent vowel "a", and take one of several modifying vowel signs to represent syllables with another vowel or no vowel at all.

Conjuncts of ണ

As is common in Indic scripts, Malayalam joins letters together to form conjunct consonant clusters. There are several ways in which conjuncts are formed in Malayalam texts: using a post-base form of a trailing consonant placed under the initial consonant of a conjunct, a combined ligature of two or more consonants joined together, a conjoining form that appears as a combining mark on the rest of the conjunct, the use of an explicit candrakkala mark to suppress the inherent "a" vowel, or a special consonant form called a "chillu" letter, representing a bare consonant without the inherent "a" vowel. Texts written with the modern reformed Malayalam orthography, put̪iya lipi, may favor more regular conjunct forms than older texts in paḻaya lipi, due to changes undertaken in the 1970s by the Government of Kerala.
 ണ് (ṇ) + ട (ṭa) gives the ligature ṇṭa:

 ണ് (ṇ) + ഠ (ṭʰa) gives the ligature ṇṭʰa:

 ണ് (ṇ) + ഡ (ḍa) gives the ligature ṇḍa:

 ണ് (ṇ) + ഢ (ḍʱa) gives the ligature ṇḍʱa:

 ക് (k) + ണ (ṇa) gives the ligature kṇa:

 ണ് (ṇ) + ണ (ṇa) gives the ligature ṇṇa:

 ഷ് (ṣ) + ണ (ṇa) gives the ligature ṣṇa:

 ണ് (ṇ) + മ (ma) gives the ligature ṇma:

 ക് (k) + ഷ് (ṣ) +  ണ (ṇa) gives the ligature kṣṇa:

Odia Ṇa

Ṇa (ଣ) is a consonant of the Odia abugida. It ultimately arose from the Brahmi letter , via the Siddhaṃ letter  Nna. Like in other Indic scripts, Odia consonants have the inherent vowel "a", and take one of several modifying vowel signs to represent syllables with another vowel or no vowel at all.

Conjuncts of ଣ 
As is common in Indic scripts, Odia joins letters together to form conjunct consonant clusters. The most common conjunct formation is achieved by using a small subjoined form of trailing consonants. Most consonants' subjoined forms are identical to the full form, just reduced in size, although a few drop the curved headline or have a subjoined form not directly related to the full form of the consonant. The second type of conjunct formation is through pure ligatures, where the constituent consonants are written together in a single graphic form. This ligature may be recognizable as being a combination of two characters or it can have a conjunct ligature unrelated to its constituent characters.
 ଣ୍ (ṇ) + ଡ (ḍa) gives the ligature ṇḍa:

 ଣ୍ (ṇ) + ଣ (ṇa) gives the ligature ṇṇa:

Comparison of Ṇa
The various Indic scripts are generally related to each other through adaptation and borrowing, and as such the glyphs for cognate letters, including Ṇa, are related as well.

Character encodings of Ṇa
Most Indic scripts are encoded in the Unicode Standard, and as such the letter Ṇa in those scripts can be represented in plain text with unique codepoint. Ṇa from several modern-use scripts can also be found in legacy encodings, such as ISCII.

References

 Conjuncts are identified by IAST transliteration, except aspirated consonants are indicated with a superscript "h" to distinguish from an unaspirated cononant + Ha, and the use of the IPA "ŋ" and "ʃ" instead of the less dinstinctive "ṅ" and "ś".

Indic letters